Terrassa Futbol Club is a Spanish football team based in Terrassa, Barcelona, in the autonomous community of Catalonia. Founded in 1906 it currently plays in Segunda División RFEF – Group 3, holding home matches at Estadi Olímpic de Terrassa, with a capacity of 11,500 spectators.

History
Terrassa's foundations were set in 1914, with the first regulations being created by the board of directors, presided by Narcís Freixa Ubach. Three years later the club played one of its first international matches, against FC Basel of Switzerland, also winning three trophies: Copa Ramón Torras, Copa del Día Gráfico and Copa Sport, playing (and winning) twice against FC Barcelona, 1–0 and 2–1.

Terrassa won its first Copa Catalunya in 1925, and first reached Segunda División seventeen years later, although it would be immediately relegated for the following 11 seasons.

In the 1960–61 campaign, with the team again in the second level – being again relegated – a Copa del Rey tie against Barça was played at the Camp Nou, with the hosts winning it 4–2 in front of over 80,000 spectators. The new ground, Estadi Olímpic de Terrassa, was also inaugurated with a 2–4 loss with Sevilla FC, as the club's new exile in Tercera División would be even longer the second time (14 years, although it is worth noting Segunda División B had not yet been created as the new division three).

On 29 May 1972, new club president Josep Masdefiol i Peralta was elected: other than aiding the club financially, he would eventually create the Trofeo Internacional de Fútbol Ciudad de Terrassa, with Real Zaragoza, Ferencvárosi TC and FC Bayern Munich being the first participants. Still, the club's anthem was created, by Vicenç Villatoro.

Terrassa played the 1977 relegation play-offs against AD Almería, winning after its opponent had fielded an ineligible player. In the 1980s, the club eventually dropped two levels, and had reached the regional leagues by 1990; as in several times in the past, the city hall intervened and enabled the club to stay afloat.

In 2001–02's third division, Terrassa finished in fifth position, but was allowed to participate in the promotion playoffs after Zaragoza's first team relegated from the top flight, rendering its reserves' possible promotion impossible. The promotion was attained after six matches and as many wins.

The club would play the next three years in division two, performing solidly in the first two: in 2002–03 Spanish Cup Terrassa fought valiantly against Real Madrid, before bowing out 5–7 on aggregate, thanks to longtime midfielder Monty who scored three goals in the tie. A fourth Catalonia Cup was added with a win at CF Gavà, before the team eventually returned to the third level at the end of 2004–05 season, as third from bottom.

Former Spanish international Juanele played one of his last professional campaigns with the club.

Season to season

15 seasons in Segunda División
18 seasons in Segunda División B
1 season in Segunda División RFEF
44 seasons in Tercera División
5 seasons in Categorías Regionales

Honours
Tercera División: 1953–54, 1961–62, 1969–70, 1974–75
Copa Catalunya: 1925, 1936, 2002, 2003

Famous players
Note: this list includes players that have appeared in at least 100 league games and/or have reached international status.

  Marc Bernaus
 Iselín Santos Ovejero
 Rolando Zárate
 Pedro Núñez
 Haruna Babangida
 Francisco Carrasco
 Cristian
 Juanele
 Monty
 José Miguel Morales
  Thomas Christiansen
  Pier
 Marco Vanzini

References

External links

Official website 
Futbolme team profile 
Unofficial website 

 
Football clubs in Catalonia
Association football clubs established in 1906
Sport in Terrassa
1906 establishments in Spain
Segunda División clubs